Independent Local Radio is the collective name given to commercial radio stations in the United Kingdom. As a result of the buyouts and mergers permitted by the Broadcasting Act 1990, and deregulation resulting from the Communications Act 2003, most commercial stations are now neither independent (although they remain independent from the BBC) nor local. The same name is used for Independent Local Radio in Ireland.

History

Development of ILR
Until the early 1970s, the BBC had a legal monopoly on radio broadcasting in the UK. Despite competition from the commercial Radio Luxembourg and, for a period in the mid-1960s, the off-shore "pirate" broadcasters, it had remained the policy of both major political parties that radio was to remain under the BBC.

Upon the election of Edward Heath's government in 1970, this policy changed. It is possible that Heath's victory was partly due to younger voters upset by the UK government closing down the popular pirate radio stations.

The new Minister of Post and Telecommunications and former ITN newscaster, Christopher Chataway, announced a bill to allow for the introduction of commercial radio in the United Kingdom. This service would be planned and regulated in a similar manner to the existing ITV service and would compete with the recently developed BBC Local Radio services (rather than the four national BBC services).

The Sound Broadcasting Act received royal assent on 12 July 1972 and the Independent Television Authority (ITA) accordingly changed its name to the Independent Broadcasting Authority (IBA) that same day.

The IBA immediately began to plan the new service, placing advertisements encouraging interested groups to apply for medium-term contracts to provide programmes in given areas. The first major areas to be advertised were London and Glasgow, with two contracts available in London, one for "news and information", one for "general and entertainment".

The London news contract was awarded to London Broadcasting Company (LBC) and they began broadcasting on 8 October 1973. The London general contract went to Capital Radio, who began broadcasting on 16 October 1973.  In total, 19 contracts were awarded between 1973 and 1976. Due to government limits on capital expenditure and turbulence in the broadcasting field (mainly due to the Annan Report), no further contracts were awarded until 1980, when a second tranche of contracts were awarded. All stations were awarded an AM and an FM frequency, on which they broadcast the same service.

First and second tranche contracts

In July 1981, the Home Secretary approved proposals for the creation of Independent Local Radio services in 25 more areas. However some of these areas were not licensed during the IBA's time as the regulator and did not receive a commercial station until after its successor, The Radio Authority, came into being in 1991.

Extension of ILR
In the late 1980s, the expansion of ILR continued at a similar rate. Under the Broadcasting Acts, the IBA had a duty to ensure that any area it licensed for radio could support a station with the available advertising revenue. Therefore, many areas were not included in the IBA's ILR plans as it was felt that they were not viable. This did not prevent Radio West in Bristol getting into financial trouble and having to merge with Wiltshire Radio on 1 October 1985; nor did it prevent Centre Radio going into receivership on 6 October 1983.

Split services
Nevertheless, the areas served by ILR continued to increase and 1986 the IBA sanctioned in principle the idea that different services could be broadcast on each station's FM and AM frequency although the first experimental part-time split service was provided by Radio Forth, who created Festival City Radio for the duration of the Edinburgh Festival in 1984. The first station to permanently split their frequencies was Guildford's County Sound who rebranded the FM output as Premier Radio and turned the AM output into a new golden oldies station, County Sound Gold in 1988. Other stations then followed suit.

By 1988, the government had decided that the practice of splitting was beneficial and a quick way to increase choice for listeners. The IBA then began a programme of encouraging ILR stations to split their services and most stations had soon complied. The usual format was to have a "gold" (oldies) service on AM and pop music on FM, although Radio City tried "City Talk" on AM before abandoning the format.

The Broadcasting Act 1990
The Broadcasting Act 1990 provided for the abolition of the IBA and its replacement by the Independent Television Commission. The IBA continued to regulate radio under the new name of the Radio Authority, but with a different remit.

As a "light-touch" regulator (although heavier than the ITC), the Radio Authority was to issue licences to the highest bidder and promote the development of commercial radio choice.

INR, RSLs, SALLIES and IRR
This led to the awarding of three national contracts, known as Independent National Radio to Classic FM, Virgin 1215 (later Virgin Radio and then rebranded Absolute Radio) and Talk Radio (later Talksport).

The Radio Authority also began to license Restricted Service Licence (RSL) stations – low-power temporary radio stations for special events, operating for up to 28 days a year – and to reduce the criteria for a "viable service area" with the introduction of Small Scale Local Licences (SALLIES) for villages, special interest groups and small communities.

By this time the medium wave band had become unpopular with radio groups and the majority of new stations were awarded an FM licence only, even when an AM licence was jointly available.

In 1994 the Radio Authority introduced regional stations (Independent Regional Radio, again usually grouped under the banner "ILR" by most commentators) and began to license the commercial Digital Audio Broadcasting (DAB) multiplexes in October 1998.

The Radio Authority was replaced by the Office of Communications (Ofcom) in 2004, which also replaced the ITC, the Broadcasting Standards Commission, the Radio Communications Agency and the Office of Telecommunications (Oftel). Ofcom has stated that they plan to continue the development of Independent Local Radio, with an emphasis on digital broadcasting, and to "ensure the character" of local stations, following the mergers and loss of local identities that followed the 1990 Act.

ILR stations
In 2005, there were 217 licensed analogue ILR and IRR services in England; 16 in Wales; 34 in Scotland; eight in Northern Ireland; and two in the Channel Islands. These are licences rather than franchises. Some licences are grouped nationally, regionally or by format to provide one service; other licences cover two or more services.

There were three national analogue services. There was one national DAB multiplex (Digital One) and 47 regional DAB multiplexes, owned by 10 and operated by nine companies (each multiplex carrying multiple services).

Manx Radio
The first licensed commercial radio station in the United Kingdom is often stated to be Manx Radio, which launched in June 1964. However, since the Isle of Man is not part of the United Kingdom, Manx Radio is not considered to be an ILR station and launched with a Post Office licence. Manx Radio is funded by a mixture of commercial advertising and a yearly £860,000 Manx Government subvention.

See also
 List of radio stations in the United Kingdom

References

External links
 Office of Communications

Radio in the United Kingdom
1973 establishments in the United Kingdom